John Charles Bethel (born January 15, 1957) is a Canadian former professional ice hockey left winger. He played in the National Hockey League (NHL) for the original Winnipeg Jets.

Bethel was born in Montreal, Quebec. He played three seasons at Boston University from 1976 to 1979, where in 1977-78 he was second in team scoring to Mike Fidler with 63 points. Bethel was drafted by the New York Rangers in the sixth round of the 1977 NHL amateur draft, but never signed with the Rangers.

Career statistics

Regular season and playoffs

References

External links

1957 births
Living people
Anglophone Quebec people
Boston University Terriers men's ice hockey players
Canadian ice hockey left wingers
Ice hockey people from Montreal
NCAA men's ice hockey national champions
New York Rangers draft picks
People from Pierrefonds-Roxboro
Sherbrooke Jets players
Tulsa Oilers (1964–1984) players
Winnipeg Jets (1979–1996) players